Horizons: Exploring the Universe is an astronomy textbook that was written by Michael A. Seeds and Dana E. Backman. It is in its 14th edition, and is used in some colleges as a guide book for introductory astronomy classes. It covers all major ideas in astronomy, from the apparent magnitude scale, to the Cosmic Microwave Background Radiation, to gamma ray bursts.

References

Astronomy books